William Gresley may refer to:

William Gresley (divine)
William Gresley (MP) for Nottingham (UK Parliament constituency)
Sir William Gresley, 3rd Baronet (1661–1710) High Sheriff of Derbyshire 1704, of the Gresley baronets
Sir William Nigel Gresley, 9th Baronet (1806–1847), of the Gresley baronets